The Endless are a family of beings who appear in American comic books published by DC Comics. The members of the family include Death, Delirium, Desire, Despair, Destiny, Destruction, and Dream. 

The Endless characters were created by Neil Gaiman and first appeared in the comic book series The Sandman (1989–1996). They embody powerful forces, or aspects, of the DC Universe. They are depicted as among the most powerful beings in the DC Universe, distinct from most gods, as gods are created by mortal belief. Dream is the protagonist of The Sandman series, but all the Endless play major roles in it.

The Endless are a dysfunctional family of seven siblings. They appear in different forms but are most often depicted as having very white skin and black hair, with the exception of redheads Delirium and Destruction. Their appearance often changes to fit the expectations of those they meet or the situation they are in.

Function and domains
The Endless spend most of their time fulfilling their functions as embodiments of natural forces. For example, Death leads the souls of the dead away from the realm of the living, while Dream oversees the realm of dreams, nightmares and imagination. One notable facet of their depiction is that none of them are "representations" or "personifications" of their function, they simply are their function; as Sto-Oa says of Death in Endless Nights, "She is Death, just as he is Dream, and that one is Desire." In The Sandman (vol. 2) #48, Destruction gives a further description of the Endless:
"The Endless are merely patterns. The Endless are ideas. The Endless are wave functions. The Endless are repeating motifs. The Endless are echoes of darkness, and nothing more... And even our existences are brief and bounded. None of us will last longer than this version of the Universe."

Some of the Endless are more dedicated to their tasks than others. The younger Endless, especially Desire, are known to play games with mortal lives. Destruction, often called "The Prodigal", abandoned his duties altogether.

If one of the Endless is destroyed, then they will be replaced by another aspect of their role, but this does not occur if they are simply absent or inactive. In such cases, the aspect of existence supervised by that member of the Endless becomes more random and chaotic. During this time the Universe may attempt to replace that member by putting some of their essence within a mortal, as it did with Wesley Dodds, who received a fraction of Dream's soul while Dream was imprisoned.

Each of the Endless has a realm in which they are sovereign. Within their realm, all members of the Endless have a gallery containing symbols, or sigils, of the other Endless. The Endless may contact each other by holding the appropriate sigil and calling for that member of the Endless. Destiny is also able to summon his siblings by using his gallery of portraits, whether they want it or not (as seen in The Sandman: Overture).

In addition to overseeing their sphere of influence, the Endless also help to define their opposites. This dualistic aspect of the Endless has been confirmed in the case of Death, who is present at the beginning as well as the end of every life. Destruction has an interest in creative pastimes, including art, poetry and cooking. Dream seems to have some power to shape reality, as seen in The Sandman (vol. 2) #18, A Dream of a Thousand Cats, in which a large number of entities, dreaming of an alternate reality, create said reality. Also, Delirium has some kind of strange logic that only makes sense to her, but that allows her to understand things that others do not.

The Sandman Overture revealed that certain Endless can deceive others and temporarily use their abilities through trickery or specific reasoning. For example, Dream was able to rescue the deceased Prez from Boss Smiley, even though Death could not because Dream is also the Prince of Stories, giving him some control over the afterlife. Desire was capable of posing as an aspect of Dream (The Dream of Cats), creating a dream Vessel that was supposedly created by Dream. It was convincing enough to fool both Destiny and Dream (but not Delirium).

The exact limits of the powers the Endless may use are subject to debate but are set by rules (such as Dream being forbidden to kill dreamers unless they become a vortex, in which case killing becomes an obligation). It is unknown if the Endless are capable to use their powers on those more powerful or more ancient than them; when at one point Dream heads into Hell to rescue a former lover of his, he admits that his power will allow him entrance, but that he does not know if he would be able to defeat Lucifer, who is a former archangel created by The Presence (the DC comics analogue of God).

Origin
The Endless are as old as the concepts that they represent. The Endless are said to be older than the fairy folk, gods, angels and other supernatural beings. Their exact ages in years are unknown, but they are known to have existed long before life on Earth; in Brief Lives, Destruction says that he has performed his duties—not counting the previous three centuries—for 10 billion years.

In The Sandman (vol. 2) #5, "Passengers", Dream is recognized by the Martian Manhunter as the dream god on ancient Mars, as well as in the Endless Nights chapter "Dream: The Heart of the Star", which takes place before our Sun's planets have "awakened" with life. Dream states in The Sandman (vol. 2) #16 that once another world was lost to a vortex. Death has claimed that she was there when the first living thing stirred, and Destiny has said that Dream gave the Earth itself the fond dream of being able to support life. Dream, according to Abel, was created shortly after Death, as living things are born before they can dream.

One of the few references to any sort of parentage for the Endless is in The Sandman (vol. 2) #70, where some sentience in the Necropolis Litharge that guards the symbols of each of the Endless wails "like a mother sorrowing for her departed child." In The Sandman: Overture #5, it is revealed that the father of the Endless is Time and their mother is Night. Night is accompanied by Dusk, who was described by illustrator J. H. Williams III as a "distant sister" to Dream although Neil Gaiman has said this was just J. H. William III hypothesizing and there is nothing in canon that says she is related to them. The script only calls her an attendant. The Sandman: Overture also reveals that Time and Night are not on friendly speaking terms.

The Endless

The Endless are not known to have proper names, although Dream has a habit of collecting different names for himself. They are each known by their respective function.

: The oldest of the Endless, Destiny appears as a blind man dressed in grey or brown robes (purple in earlier comics), carrying a large book, the Cosmic Log. The book is chained to him, or he is chained to the book, and within the book is written the entire sum of existence, past, present and future. Destiny seems the most possessed by his function and responsibilities of any of the Endless. He rarely demonstrates much personality. His sigil is his book. His speech appears as a regular word balloon with letters in italics. In his garden are paths souls walk along as they fulfill their lives. Destiny is the only sibling who did not originate in The Sandman; he was created by Marv Wolfman and Bernie Wrightson for Weird Mystery Tales in 1972.
Death: Death appears as a level-headed young Goth woman. Her appearance was inspired by Utah-based performer Cinamon Hadley, a friend of illustrator Mike Dringenberg. The character wears a silver ankh (representing the afterlife), which serves as her sigil. She has a marking similar to an Eye of Horus around her right eye. Her personal realm/domain is the Sunless Lands.  Death prefers to dress and act casually and is on better terms with Dream than any of the other Endless. Her speech is presented in regular letters in a regular balloon. She spends one day out of every century as a mortal, living and dying on Earth. She is by far the most pleasant of The Endless, being kind and personable to almost everyone; encountering her upon dying feels like "meeting an old friend". However, she is capable of intimidation: in "Season of Mists", she browbeat Desire into silence; and in "The Kindly Ones", she ordered The Furies to be silent so that she and Dream could speak.  
Dream:
Dream (Morpheus): Portrayed as both lord and personification of all dreams and fictional stories. His face and physique are based on the amalgamation of Neil Gaiman in his twenties, The Cure's frontman Robert Smith, ballet dancer Farukh Ruzimatov and Bauhaus frontman Peter Murphy. Journalists have listed Dream among the best comic book characters. Dream's usual appearance is as a tall, pale man with wild dark blue-black hair. He dresses in a shapeless cloak of "night" with "flames dancing in its folds". His eyes are pools of shadows with glimmers of light within. He is known by many names, most commonly "Morpheus". He has a long history of insensitivity towards others, and throughout The Sandman, he must come to deal with his past cruelties. He is very concerned with fulfilling his responsibilities. His sigil is his dream-helm, made from the spine and skull of a long-dead god. His personal realm/domain is called "The Dreaming".  His word balloons have wavy edges and a black background outlined in white, with white lettering.
Dream: Morpheus' successor appears as a tall, pale young man with white hair and a white costume. Like Morpheus, his eyes are formed by shadows with a glimmer of light in their center. Before becoming the new Dream at the end of The Sandman, he was a young boy named Daniel, which he later retains as a name. Daniel was gestated in dreams for two years, the child of Lyta Trevor-Hall and the ghost of Hector Hall. He is generally softer in his approach than Morpheus. Daniel carries an emerald eagle stone, although his sigil remains the same (that of the dream-helm). His word balloons are similar to Morpheus', only with a white background and black lettering.
: A very large, robust man with red hair, who sometimes appears bearded and sometimes shaven. Destruction abandoned his duties as one of the Endless three hundred years ago, causing much conflict between him and his siblings. He did so out of a refusal to be responsible for the scientific destruction following the enlightenment. Since abandoning his realm, the other Endless usually refer to him as "the Prodigal" or "Brother" rather than "Destruction". He has a passion for creative and constructive endeavors, but little talent. His sigil is a sword. His text is regular, in a balloon with a bold outline.
: Desire is androgynous, capable of appearing as a man, a woman, neither, or possibly both (in the epilogue of The Sandman: Overture, Despair refers to Desire as "sister-brother"; in Season of Mists, Dream refers to Desire as “sibling”). Desire has a cruel streak and a long-standing rivalry with Dream, their relationship deteriorating eons ago after Desire caused Dream to fall in love with a woman who ultimately left him for another. Desire's sigil is a silver-tinted glass heart shape and they live in a huge flesh-and-blood statue of themselves called "The Threshold". Although Desire is Despair's twin, in a sense they are older than Despair. The current incarnation of Desire is the original one, while Despair is currently in her second incarnation.
: Twin sister to Desire:
The First Despair: In her first form, Despair had many of the same physical qualities as her later form, but taller and tattooed with intricate red lines. She was also much more talkative and self-assured than her later incarnation. She is occasionally mentioned in passing and is later depicted in The Sandman: Endless Nights. It is hinted that she may have been responsible for the destruction of the planet Krypton as a means to create the ultimate despair. It has been suggested that she was murdered and that the one responsible will suffer until the end of existence.
The Second Despair: A short, obese woman with greyish skin and irregularly-shaped teeth. She is always naked. Despair has a cold, quietly intelligent manner. She has a habit of carving her flesh with a hooked ring that she wears, which is also her sigil. The second aspect is the one that appears throughout the main storyline. Despair's text is normal in a balloon with ragged-waved edges. She often associates with Desire but unlike Desire, she was fond of Destruction.
: The youngest of the Endless, Delirium appears as a young girl whose form changes the most frequently of any of the Endless, based on the random fluctuations of her temperament. She has wild multicolored hair and eccentric, mismatched clothes. Her only permanent physical characteristic is that one of her eyes is emerald green (usually the right side) splattered with silver flecks and the other pale blue (usually the left side), but even those sometimes switch between left and right. Her sigil is an abstract, shapeless blob of colors. Her speech is portrayed in standard comic book block-caps, characterized by wavy, unpredictable orientation and a multi-colored gradient background. She was once known as Delight, but some traumatic event (of which even Destiny does not know the particulars) caused her to change into her current role. Her sigil as Delight was a flower.

In other media
 The Endless appear in the TV adaptation of The Sandman. Dream, Death, Despair and Desire appear in the first season, portrayed by Tom Sturridge, Kirby Howell-Baptiste, Donna Preston and Mason Alexander Park, respectively. Destiny, Delirium, and Destruction are mentioned in some episodes.
 Dream and Death also appear in Joe Hill's graphic novel extended series Locke and Key, in the prequel story arc titled Hell & Gone.

References

Sources
 
 

DC Comics deities
Fictional families
Mythology in DC Comics
The Sandman (comic book)
Characters created by Neil Gaiman
Comics characters introduced in 1989
DC Comics organizations
Comics about dreams